Jane Patterson Priddis, Alberta is a female judoka from Canada. She competed for her native country at the 1992 Summer Olympics in Barcelona, Spain, where she was defeated in the first round of the repêchage.

Patterson won two bronze medals at the 1991 Pan American Games, in the Women's Heavyweight (+ 72 kg) and in the Women's Open Class division. She was affiliated with the Shidokan Judo Club in Montreal.

See also
Judo in Canada

References
sports-reference

Living people
Canadian female judoka
Judoka at the 1992 Summer Olympics
Olympic judoka of Canada
Sportspeople from Alberta
Year of birth missing (living people)
Pan American Games bronze medalists for Canada
Judoka at the 1990 Commonwealth Games
Commonwealth Games medallists in judo
Commonwealth Games silver medallists for Canada
Pan American Games medalists in judo
Judoka at the 1991 Pan American Games
Medalists at the 1991 Pan American Games
20th-century Canadian women
21st-century Canadian women
Medallists at the 1990 Commonwealth Games